Samora is a unisex given name and a surname. People with the name include:

Given name
 Samora Fihlani (born 1985), South African rugby union player 
 Samora Goodson (born 1984), American football player
 Samora Khulu (died 2008), South African football player
 Samora Machel (1933–1986), Mozambican military commander and political leader
 Samora Smallwood, Canadian actress and writer
 Samora Yunis (born 1949), Ethiopian military officer

Surname
 Julian Samora (1920–1996), American scholar
 Rogério Samora (1958–2021), Portuguese actor

Unisex given names